Koop is a surname. Notable people with the surname include:

Aire Koop (born 1957), Estonian actress
Arnold Koop (1922–1988), Estonian historian, university rector
Bill Koop (1906-1950), Australian rules footballer
Doug Koop (born 1960), Australian rules footballer 
C. Everett Koop (1916–2013), Surgeon General of the United States from 1982 to 1989
Wanda Koop (born 1951), Canadian painter

See also 
 Koop (disambiguation)
 Coop (disambiguation)

Dutch-language surnames
Estonian-language surnames
Russian Mennonite surnames